Cyril Gardner (30 May 1898 - 30 December 1942) was a French-born American actor, film director, editor and screenwriter.

Gardner was born Cyril Gottlieb in Paris, France in 1898 and emigrated to the United States at an early age, where he changed his surname to 'Gardner'. He began his career as a child actor, most notably in a starring role in the 1913 Thomas H. Ince-directed Cilvil War drama The Drummer of the 8th, opposite child star Mildred Harris.

Selected filmography

Director
 Declassee (1925) editor
 The Trespasser (1929) editor
 Grumpy (1930)
 The Royal Family of Broadway (1930)
 Reckless Living (1931)
 Doomed Battalion (1932)
 Perfect Understanding (1933)
 Big Business (1934)
 Widow's Might (1935)

Screenwriter
 Chick (1936)

Editor
 Prisoners of the Pines (1918)
 Whispers (1920)

References

External links

1898 births
1942 deaths
American film directors
American male screenwriters
American male film actors
American male silent film actors
French emigrants to the United States
Male actors from Paris
20th-century American male actors
20th-century American male writers
20th-century American screenwriters